Mario Bortolotto (26 June 1957 – 9 September 2022) was an Australian rules footballer who played with Geelong and Carlton in the VFL.

Bortolotto played as a defender and started his career at Geelong. He was delisted after two seasons and crossed to Carlton with whom he would be a premiership player in 1981 and 1982.

References

External links

Blueseum profile

1957 births
2022 deaths
Carlton Football Club players
Carlton Football Club Premiership players
Geelong Football Club players
Leopold Football Club (Geelong) players
Australian rules footballers from Victoria (Australia)
Two-time VFL/AFL Premiership players